Matthew Biggs (born 1960), is a radio personality in the UK, best known for his appearances on the long running BBC Radio 4 programme Gardeners' Question Time. He has been a professional gardener for over 25 years, since studying at Pershore College of Horticulture and the Royal Botanic Gardens, Kew.

His first appearance on TV was on Channel 4's Garden Club. He directed the long-running Grass Roots programme for ITV. He is a contributor to BBC Gardeners' World magazine and blogs on Matthew Biggs Gardening Diary.

He currently lives in Flamstead, Hertfordshire and is a member of the Christadelphian church.

External links
BBC
Gardening celebs
Matthew Biggs Gardening Diary
The People's Gardener

British television presenters
Living people
Christadelphians
English Christians
People from Flamstead
1960 births